Big Rockfish Presbyterian Church is an historic Presbyterian church located at Hope Mills, Cumberland County, North Carolina. It was built in 1855, and is a two-story, three bay by four bay, gable-end frame building with double front entrances in the vernacular Greek Revival style.

It was listed on the National Register of Historic Places in 1983.

Worship still continues each Sunday at 11AM with education hour at 10AM. The church hosts many special events throughout the year for different ages and for the community. The church is alongside Highway 301 (I-95 Business) Northbound side, Marracco St is the service road. The church is at the corner with McNeil St. 0.7 miles north of the Highway 59 Overpass.

It is part of The Presbyterian Church USA and the Presbytery of Coastal Carolina.

The church has an historic cemetery. Some details about the cemetery are online.

The church is referred to in a short story by Charles W. Chesnutt entitled "The Marked Tree," where a young man attends this church and becomes very religeous while dating a local Rockfish belle he later marries.

References

Presbyterian churches in North Carolina
Churches on the National Register of Historic Places in North Carolina
Greek Revival church buildings in North Carolina
Churches completed in 1855
19th-century Presbyterian church buildings in the United States
Churches in Cumberland County, North Carolina
National Register of Historic Places in Cumberland County, North Carolina